More Left was an electoral alliance formed by More for Mallorca (Més), More for Menorca (MxMe)  and Republican Left of Catalonia (ERC) to contest the November 2019 Spanish general election in the Balearic Islands, as a successor of the Progressive Voices coalition that ran in the April election, without the participation of Now Ibiza (Ara), that gave external support. Guillem Balboa, who headed the predecessor candidacy, was also the candidate for this alliance, which did not win any seat with a score of just over 4% of the valid votes.

Composition

Electoral performance

Cortes Generales

References

Political parties in the Balearic Islands
Defunct political party alliances in Spain
Political parties established in 2019
2019 establishments in Spain